Group K of the 2019 FIBA Basketball World Cup was the second stage of the 2019 FIBA Basketball World Cup for four teams, top two teams from Group E and two from Group F. The results of round one were carried over. The teams played against the teams from the group they have not faced before, for a total of two games per team, with all games played at Shenzhen Bay Sports Centre, Shenzhen. After all of the games were played, the top two teams advance´d to Quarter-finals, the third placed team was classified 9 to 12 and the fourth placed team 13 to 16.

Qualified teams

Standings

All times are local UTC+8.

Games

Brazil vs. Czech Republic

United States vs. Greece

Czech Republic vs. Greece

United States vs. Brazil

References

External links

2019 FIBA Basketball World Cup